Institut textile et chimique de Lyon (ITECH Lyon) is a French graduate engineering school created in 1988.

It is located in Écully, close to Lyon, and specializes in the field of polymeric materials.

The College is member of the Union of Independent Grandes Écoles.

History 
The history of ITECH began with the creation of the École de tissage de Lyon in 1883. This school, which specialized in silk, was logically located in the city of Lyon, the heart of the French textile industry. At the same time, in 1899, the École française de la Tannerie was opened. Although specialized in leather, this school quickly diversified into plastics processing (with the help of the Conservatoire national des arts et métiers).

In 1969, with the opening of a department of paints, inks and adhesives, the École française de la Tannerie became the ESCEPEA (École Supérieure du Cuir et des Peintures, Encres et Adhésifs).

1988 marks an important turning point in the history of the school since it officially takes the name ITECH, following the merger between ESCEPEA and ESITL.

In 1993, ITECH became a member of the Polytechnic Institute of Lyon, which brought together ECAM, ISARA, CPE and ITECH.

References

External links 
 

Engineering universities and colleges in France
Grandes écoles
Universities and colleges in Lyon